was a Japanese science fantasy social network game developed and published by COLOPL. It was released in Japan on April 16, 2015. An anime adaptation was green-lit to celebrate the one year anniversary of the game. The anime adaptation, which was later revealed to be a television series, aired in Japan from July 2 to September 17, 2017. Crunchyroll added Battle Girl High School to its catalog on November 11, 2018.

The game ended service on July 31, 2019.

Characters

Shinjugamine Jogakuen
It is apparently a private girls' school with a consistent middle and high school. In the center of the school there is a large tree with a mysterious power called the sacred tree.

High school freshman

Birthday: March 15, Height: 156cm, weight: 45Kg, 3 size: 83/54/82, blood type: O type, extracurricular activities: Lacrosse section. In fact, he is the main character in the main story of the app version and the heroine hero, and he is also the main character in the anime version. I guided the school to the new teacher who is the main character. The hair is a reddish-brown semi-long hair with the left side tied with a red scrunchie when viewed from the person himself, and has ahoge. A smile is a trademark, and she has a cheerful and cheerful personality. Although he tends to misunderstand it easily, he has the personality and desire to lead the Hoshimori class with his own brightness. There are places where I overdo it for someone, and in the past I've been chasing minor injuries. Also, in the first part, due to this personality, he was temporarily unable to fight. The reason for becoming Hoshimori is "I thought that Irouth was a bad guy who erased people's smiles. I belong to the lacrosse club because I like to move my body and it's cool, but at first I wanted to go to the cooking club. You can roll back". His dream for the future is a pastry chef, but his cooking skill is devastating [7], and he is unaware that he is not good at cooking. The image color of the Hoshimori Idol Project is red, and he is the leader of the team red "Tiara". The first person is "I". He has a younger sister named "Miku" and a dog named "Souffle". The name of Ada from Urara is "Mikiti Senpai". The image color is red. In the "Adoga", "Princess leader of (Princess)"

Birthday: May 4, Height: 157 cm, Weight: 45 kg, 3 sizes: 78/57/78, Blood type: A type, Club activities: Futsal club. A sports girl with a lively personality. Boasts top-class motor nerves among Hoshimori. The influence of Ashitaba, my longing senior, was a big factor in becoming Hoshimori. The third part mentions a little about being saved by Ashitaba five years ago. The hairstyle is a green shortcut with a yellow-green hairpin on the right side when viewed from the person. There is a women's fan club in the school, which is loved by other girls because of their versatility in sports and brave fighting in the Irouth subjugation strategy. He was often confessed and received a love letter with 100 stationery sheets. Although he doesn't say it, he has a girlish side, such as cute clothes and animals. He says he's not interested in anything other than sports in public, but he really cares that he's not like a girl. The first person is "I". There is a younger brother named "Akira" who is tomoe nage to relieve the stress of Subaru. The name of Ada from Urara is "Subaru Senpai". The image color is green. In "Adga", he belongs to "Princess".

Birthday: September 23, Height: 155 cm, Weight: 43 kg, 3 sizes: 85/57/85, Blood type: A type, Club activities: Brass band club. A person with a gentle and gentle personality. My parents' house is a hospital, and I am trying to follow the same path. The reason I became Hoshimori is "I don't want everyone I love to get hurt". The hair is braided with a light blue hairpin on the left side when viewed from the person, and the long gray hair is braided with a light blue ribbon on the right side. Regardless of appearance, he is a Tone deaf person. I love strawberry tarts so much that strawberry tarts come out in my nightmares. Hoshimori is the only owner of a steel stomach that can evaluate the devastating Miki's dishes as delicious. In addition, she seems to admit that she is not as good at cooking as Miki. Miki is a childhood friend. The brass band club is in charge of the flute, and works part-time at a jazz cafe.
The first person is "I". I have a younger sister named "Shizuka". The name of Ada from Urara is "Haruharu Senpai". The image color is light blue. In "Adga", he belongs to "Princess".

Birthday: November 11, Height: 159 cm, Weight: 45 kg, 3 sizes: 84/55/86, Blood type: O type, Club activities: Homecoming club. First appearance in the anime version. In the app version, it appears as a playable character in the scenario of Part 4 linked with animation. Another main character in the anime version. A mysterious girl who suddenly moved in as the "19th Hoshimori". She has long reddish-brown hair, a red muffler over her uniform, and a long black coat (the anime version does not have a coat or muffler). At first, only her name and age were known, but she has a high ability as a star guard and has a strict personality to herself and others. Therefore, she sometimes made remarks and took a bitter attitude that looked down on other Hoshimori, and often got annoyed by other Hoshimori such as Kaedeya and Yuri. She denies the bonds of her peers from the idea of creating spoiledness and weakness, and often dislikes acting with others and takes an attitude of pushing them away. It is speculated from Miki that this series of actions is "the inside out of the feeling that no one wants to be hurt", and she also understands that her friends are important internally, and she was in a pinch. Often trying to help the star guards. After that, she began to take an attitude of trying to be honest due to the influence of walnuts, and after that, she seemed to be particularly fond of walnuts. It doesn't look like it, but I like comedy shows. The more she was in the fan club, the more she was a fan of "f * f", and in the anime she danced in turn because she looked similar to the injured Hanane.
His true identity is Hoshimori, who came from a parallel world, and her real name is Miku Hoshitsuki. Miki's younger sister (Miki in a parallel world), which will be described later. Although there was "Judgment Day" in her world, Hoshimori succeeded in repelling it. However, the blessing of the sacred tree was lost, her world was destroyed, she was helped by her sister, and she was summoned to the sacred tree in our world. After the incident, she remains in the world of Miki on his own will, but after the defeat of Iris in the final part, she returned to the original world by the call of the sacred tree of the world of Misaki.
The first person is "I". Call everyone's name by abandonment, regardless of whether they are younger or older. The name of Ada from Urara is "Misa Amane Senpai" (abandoned in the anime). The image color is reddish brown.

High school junior

Birthday: July 7, Height: 160 cm, Weight: 44 kg, 3 sizes: 86/54/84, Blood type: O type, Club activities: Tennis club. A caring fashion leader. Her mother is a fashion designer and she dreams of launching her own brand. As a result, she is sensitive to fashion and often surprises lilies with cutting-edge clothing. The reason for becoming Hoshimori is "because only I can do it". Hair is long orange hair. It tends to be seen as playing from a gorgeous and flashy appearance, but in reality it is a mild androphobia and has no experience of romance. Therefore, I am proud of being a master of consultation, but I am not good at consultation related to romance. With the exception of the main character, he talks comfortably with his mouth. In the Hoshimori Idol Project, we designed and produced costumes for all units. Although he belongs to the tennis club, he seems to be one of his hobbies, and he doesn't really work on it. The first person is "I" and "Nozomi-chan". The name of Ada from Urara is "Nozomi Senpai". The image color is orange. Belongs to "ROUGE" in "Adga".

Birthday: August 14, Height: 148 cm, Weight: 38 kg, 3 sizes: 72/55/79, Blood type: A type, Club activities: Kendo club. Chairman of the discipline with a strong sense of justice. The reason why he became Hoshimori is because Yuri's heart decided that "Irouth, who is harmful to humankind, is evil, and Hoshimori, who defeats it, is justice". The long reddish-brown hair, which is close to red, is made into a ponytail with a red ribbon. He has a complex of his shortness and small breasts, and when he touches on it, he yells in tears. "I belong to the Kendo club, believing that it is the best way to train my mind and body". Although the school's morals have been maintained by the crackdown on lilies, other students have dismissed them as "too straightforward" and have been dismissed by their signature activities. He has a serious personality, but for that reason, he "walks sideways like a crab so that he can't see the mask of the squadron attached to his temporal region when he meets his teacher at the summer festival. "I often misunderstood the masked men with weapons (genuine) as special effects shooting until the end". Also, the eyesight is good enough to recognize 500m ahead. The first person is "I". The second daughter of the three sisters, her sister is "Yumi" and her sister is "Yuki". He has two dogs, "Seigi" and "Makoto", which were once police dogs, and he is jogging early in the morning with his dog. His father is a police officer, and his parents are called "father" and "mother". The name of Ada from Urara is "Yuririn Senpai". The image color is enji. Belongs to "ROUGE" in "Adga".

Birthday: September 30, Height: 158 cm, Weight: 46 kg, 3 sizes: 91/62/89, Blood type: AB type, Club activity: Chemistry Research Department (indicated as [Chemistry Department] on the card). A self-paced, unfussy girl who can talk to plants. Has a core strength that does not move anything. Although he doesn't show much attitude, he takes great care of his friends and family. Hair is yellowish green semi-long hair. Having a father who is a botanist, he also has hobbies such as home gardening and botanical research. My mother was a professional gardener called "Green Hand", but Kurumi died when she was young. Born in Hokkaido. Due to severe mechanical noise, the walnuts are broken by approaching or touching (8 smartphones have been broken since the main character took office). The hero gives his smartphone, thinking that "the way of wrapping is just wrong", but he also destroys the hero's smartphone. In the "pre-general election", which is a popular vote before the start of distribution, he won about 90,000 votes, which is almost double the second place, and became the first place [8]. The first person is "I". He is the only child of Hoshimori and has two dogs, "Hana" and "Tsubomi". Except for Nozomi and Yuri of the same grade, all names are given honorific titles and are treated with honorifics. The name of Ada from Urara is "Kurukuru Senpai". The image color is yellow-green. In "Adga", he is the leader of "ROUGE".

Birthday: August 28, Height: 157 cm, Weight: 43 kg, 3 sizes: 85/55/83, Blood type: AB type, Club activities: Track and field club. A tsundere beautiful girl who is strict with herself and others. One of the national idols "f * f (Fortissimo)". Good at dancing. Hairstyle is a blonde pigtail tied with a black ribbon. He has an "f" hairpin on his right bangs that matches Shiho. Originally a student at Sonomiya Jogakuin, he transferred to a domestic student in the second part of Chapter 3 of Part 2. In the first meeting, I was pushed down by the hero and rubbed my chest and saw my underwear, so from the worst impression I despised him as much as I wanted to say "metamorphosis teacher" "fucking teacher" "garbage insect" "stalker" However, he gradually opens his heart. He said to the hero, "Give him the right to be a servant", "I don't feel like treating him as a human because he's with me", and when he's in a bad mood, he says, "Tread on his face with bare feet". A slightly sadistic personality, such as trampling. When Shiho is taken into the darkness, she makes a soft noise and gives up, but recovers from the rebuke of Urara. Became a star guardian with the protection of Kazuki, and confronts all the masterminds, Aoi Nanami. After that, he officially moved to the Hoshimori class. The first person is "I" and has a younger brother. The name of Ada from Urara is "Kanono Senpai". The image color is canary yellow. Appeared as the top idol "f * f" in "Adga".

Birthday: October 24, Height: 161 cm, Weight: 50 kg, 3 sizes: 89/62/93, Blood type: O type, Club activities: Literature club. An elusive adult girl. One of the national idols "f * f (Fortissimo)". Good at singing. The hair is blue semi-long hair, and a small flower hair ornament is attached to the left side to make a dumpling. The hairpin of "f" that matches Hanane is attached to the left bangs when viewed from the person himself. Originally a scholarship student at Sonomiya Jogakuin, he transferred to a domestic student in the second part of Chapter 3 of Part 2. The idol was invited by Hanane who listened to her song, and was originally not the type to come forward with a withdrawal thought. He values Hanane who invited him to the idol more than anyone else, and he named his weapon "Blade Cannon", took a bath with him, and said that he would not forgive him if he touched Hanane. Hanane says, "I'm scared when I get angry". He loves detectives, and sometimes the word "undercover investigation" makes his eyes shine, and when something strange happens, he begins to make inferences like a detective. Believing that she was abandoned by Hanane's remarks in Shibuya and being notified of her solo activities by her office in Part 2, Chapter 5, she was taken into the darkness by the illusion created by Aoi Nanami and Arles, which will be described later. It becomes a strange figure. With the efforts of Hanane and Hoshimori, he returns to the original state and becomes a Hoshimori with the protection of the sacred tree and confronts all the masterminds, Aoi Nanami. After all, he officially moved to the Hoshimori class with Hanane. The first person is "I". The family is a large family with parents, three younger sisters and two younger brothers. Except for Hanane, all of them, regardless of whether they are older or younger, call their surnames with honorific titles. The name of my hamster is "Watson". The name of Ada from Urara is "Senior Shihocchi". The image color is cobalt blue. Appeared as the top idol "f * f" in "Adga".

3rd year high school

Birthday: November 1, Height: 152 cm, Weight: 45 kg, 3 sizes: 90/63/91, Blood type: B type, Club activities: PC club. A net nerd who is not good at talking directly with people, including family members. It's talkative in email and chat. His hobbies are programming and writing blogs, and the reason why he became Hoshimori is "it may be a source of blogs". Her blog has more than 1 million followers, but the blogger "AZUKI" hides it from the surroundings because of the opposite personality. He lives irregularly and sometimes gets up at 19:00 on his days off. Tiara's Hoshimori live was delivered to the colony, the moon, and Mars.
The long brown hair that extends to the waist is made into a twin tail with a huge hair accessory like a clothespin. It seems that it is left as it is because it is "troublesome". He loves games like no other, and has won 99 consecutive victories in arcade fighting games, and even has the title of Gaesen Queen. You have to clear anything that has the name of a game. The family is indoors except for grandparents, and even family conversations are chatted. His father is a programmer and his mother runs an online shopping company. I have an older brother. Parents are called "daddy" and "mama". The first person is "I". The name of Ada from Urara is "Anchan Senpai". The image color is magenta. In "Adga", it belongs to "/ MUTE".

Birthday: June 26, Height: 166 cm, Weight: 52 kg, 3 sizes: 93/60/90, Blood type: B type, Club activities: Rhythmic gymnastics club. A sexy older sister with outstanding proportions who loves cute girls who misleads adults with words and deeds that make her conscious of lustrous women. Among the female students who appear, she has the largest breasts and is the tallest. Hair is long pink hair. Its proportions are top class among Hoshimori, and he is enthusiastic about body care such as doing calisthenics on holidays. But it's aimed at pretty girls, not men. The reason why he became Hoshimori is "I can't see a pretty girl in danger. I like wet clothes, I can't see it because I can't see it, but even though it's a girls' school, I sometimes say and act as a habitual criminal who brings in gravure magazines for men" [11].
He observes the schoolgirl with binoculars and writes it down in his notebook. I hate effort so much that the word "effort" doesn't appear in her dictionary. Currently, I am doing rhythmic gymnastics to maintain proportions (I joined the club even for cute girls), but it was revealed in Chapter 3 special edition "Kawaii ga Minamoto ♡" that I used to do ballet. Arles tried to pierce the past and fall into the darkness, but Renge's too positive words and deeds, and the motive for becoming a star guard were all unexpected motives for Arles, so he was rejected. Arles's strategy was broken, such as powering up Kamisei, and he was forced to run away. The first person is "Renge". I have an older brother. The name of Ada from Urara is "Renren Senpai". Image color is pale purple color. In "Adga", the leader of "/ MUTE".

Birthday: January 18, Height: 163 cm, Weight: 51 kg, 3 sizes: 85/55/86, Blood type: A type, Club activities: Homecoming club (belonging to the student organization) The daughter of the Kusunoki family, who is a supporter of Hoshimori, and the student council president with a serious personality. The reason for becoming Hoshimori was "My mother was Hoshimori's OG" and "I thought it was my mission to fight". The hair is long blue hair with a princess cut. She was familiar with the three of them during the Hoshimori era because she was an additional member when Mari, Ki, and Furan were fighting as Hoshimori. Renka's "favorite" is sometimes mischievous by her, such as body touch and hugging. It looks so solid that it is said to be "Park Nenjin" by lotus flower and "Katamari of responsibility" by red bean paste, but in fact, it has many weaknesses such as ghosts, dark places, and dislike of dentists and not being able to swim much. Parents are called "father" and "mother" and are treated with honorifics. He is called "Mr. Tomorrow" by his mother. There is an older brother named "Hayato". The first person is "I". The name of Ada from Urara is "Azucchi Senpai". Occasionally, the person himself may call himself the ada name "Azuazu". The image color is blue and the leader of the team blue "Sirius".
In "Adga", it belongs to "/ MUTE".
In the third part, the appearance at the time of joining the above-mentioned additional personnel in the first grade of junior high school appeared. It was written as "Ashitaba (Middle 1)" and was treated as a different person from Ashitaba, a high school student.

Junior high school freshman

Birthday: March 27, Height: 149 cm, Weight: 38 kg, 3 sizes: 77/56/80, Blood type: AB type, Club activities: Shogi club. A girl who speaks in an old population style due to the influence of her grandfather who has been with her since she was a child. He says he can speak normally, but he seems to be "sick". He calls his grandfather "jiji" and admires him, and the hairpin he always wears is a gift from his grandfather. Her hair is thin brown long hair, and she has a bun on the top of her head. He has a personality that takes care of things, and even getting dressed is a hassle. In shogi, he is a first-class skill, and even though he is asleep, he defeats the hero. I was afraid of heights, and when I tested Valkyrie, I started crying because of the height and fear. Just by looking at the dance choreography, he can do it almost perfectly, and once he sees and hears it, he seems to be able to memorize it instantly, and his head turns quickly. The ability as a star guard is very high, and it is said that it is the momentum to break the record of defeating Ellows in the past. The reason for becoming Hoshimori is "I'm worried about Hinata". The first person is "I". There is a younger sister called "bell", and the tone of the bell is very normal. The name of Ada from Urara is "Sakuran". The image color is light brown. In "Adga", he belongs to "Clover". The person in charge is the base.

Birthday: April 15, Height: 141 cm, Weight: 35 kg, 3 sizes: 76/55/74, Blood type: O type, Club activities: Softball club. An energetic girl full of vitality. A machine gun talk that has a cheerful and friendly personality and does not stop once you start talking. I am on good terms with Sakura, who has the opposite personality. The reason for becoming Hoshimori is "because he was chosen as a sacred tree". He spares no effort to recapture the earth and has a single-minded strength. Brown short hair is pigtailed up with dog hair ornaments. Born in a large family, the youngest of six siblings with three older sisters and two older brothers. The name is unknown because he is called "[Dai Chu Chi] sister / brother". Although he is the shortest in the Hoshimori class, he hates being treated as a child and has a secret hobby of playing an adult woman by secretly using his sister's clothes and makeup. His father is a famous moderator. It seems that it specializes in wedding halls, but it is also called for neighborhood association events. The first person is "Hinata". The name of Ada from Urara is "Hinata". The image color is yellow. In the "Adoga", "Clover leader of (Clover)". The person in charge is the drum.

Birthday: December 7, Height: 147 cm, Weight: 39 kg, 3 sizes: 85/54/77, Blood type: ?, Club activities: None. A girl of a race called "Sof". Evina protected her while she was wandering around the earth. Long green hair is tied in two with a red ribbon. He is very lonely because there was no one around him when he woke up, and he is extremely afraid to be alone. Using it by Evina, she opposes Hoshimori as it is said, but after being defeated by Hoshimori twice, Evina is deprived of her "ability to manipulate Ellows" and is abandoned, but she is protected by Hoshimori. The teachers were worried about the danger, but were rescued at Michelle's discretion. Kaede once opposed the transfer to the Hoshimori class and was about to be left behind on Earth, but she protected her from being attacked by Ellows, and a friendship with Kaede was born. After that, he became the 16th Hoshimori who was selected as a sacred tree, and was taken over by the Sendouin family.
All but the main character (including the teacher) are abandoned, but the notation is in katakana. I have a teddy bear with an eyepatch called a hack as my family. The first person is "Sadone". The name of Ada from Urara is "Sadocchi". In the special edition, it turns out that he is not a race called "Sof" but a decent human being. Sadne dreamed of "a dream of men and women coming out" and the existence of her real parents (at this point it was unknown whether she was alive or not, but her story in the final part, "The Name of Osoroi" According to a memorandum left by Erica, who was handed over to Sadone from Vanda, her parents were researchers of an organization called "Sof" and Evina accidentally found the machine attached to her and opened the facility on "Judgment Day". It was revealed from her mouth that she had attached it to a young Sadone who was crying and clinging to her parents who had collapsed in the assaulting and burning facility.) Also, something like a pointed ear is a machine that is related to the brain and nerves and interferes with memory when it is cracked by the attack of Ellows. You have to choose between repairing and removing cracks, but neither of them has advantages and disadvantages, and it is not something that can be decided promptly. I decided to do that.
However, Kaede and Kaede's father grasp that a pair of men and women may be Sadone's parents, and Irouth appears at the place where he is going to visit, and he goes to rescue by breaking the restraint of Tree and Furan. When I was suddenly hit by a large Ellows, my ears were completely broken and I fainted with the shock. However, Sadne will not lose her memory, and the ear machine will come off and she will be able to keep her memory. Also, after clearing this special edition, it became possible to choose with or without ears, and there was no costume that forced to have ears or no ears until the end. The image color is mint green. In "Adga", he belongs to "Clover". The person in charge is the guitar and the main vocal.

Junior high school sophomore

Birthday: December 24, Height: 154 cm, Weight: 42 kg, 3 sizes: 78/55/76, Blood type: A type, Club activities: Art club. A noble girl who is the daughter of the Count family and speaks in the tone of a young lady. Her hair is long blonde hair wrapped in a young lady, and she is half-up with a pink ribbon. He has been studying imperial studies since he was a child and respects his family name, but he is not a high-ranking car, he is kind to his friends, and he does his best to do things. The reason for becoming Hoshimori is "because it is natural to work for everyone as a member of the Sendouin family". Kaede is said to be the first to be selected as Hoshimori among the Sendouin family who have led people from the world of Heian. He has a deep knowledge of art and likes Impressionist paintings, but his paintings are not very good. In addition, although he is not aware of it, he is terrible. He wrote a poem-style diary, and for that reason he was in charge of the lyrics for all the teams in the Hoshimori Idol Project. In the second part of Part 1, Chapter 6, only one person opposed the transfer of Sadne to the Hoshimori class, but when Sadne protected Kaede from the attack of Irouth, friendship grew and the Sendouin family took over. Became. In addition, I have been in conflict with students in other classes because I value my family name. He likes cup ramen, and when he first saw it, he thought it was magical. I was impressed by the deliciousness of hamburgers, called convenience store rice balls "breakthrough inventions", "I want to skip things, so please tell me", remembering how to use microwave ovens and vending machines, my nose It is not a matter of course for ordinary people, such as becoming expensive. My father is "Iwajuro", the 54th generation owner of Sendouin. The first person is "Watakushi". The name of Ada from Urara is "Kaekae". The image color is pink. In "Adga", he belongs to "Clover". The person in charge is the keyboard.

Birthday: June 3, Height: 145 cm, Weight: 39 kg, 3 sizes: 84/56/78, Blood type: O type, Club activities: Handicraft club. He likes fancy things and has a friendly personality. Hoshimori class mascot. The reason for becoming Hoshimori is "I saw the special feature on Ellows on TV", but the desire to regain the earth is the same as other Hoshimori. The dumpling is a bright blonde that is said to be "kiiro-ish". Since the name Michelle is nicknamed Mimi in France, it is well established in the Hoshimori class with her Ada name and first person. I ask the hero to call it that way, but from the standpoint of a teacher, the hero calls him "Michel". There is a characteristic habit of "Mumii", and one word contains various emotional expressions. The name of Ada from Urara is "Mimicchi". There is a very lonely side, such as being uncomfortable if you don't stick to someone's arm, and not being able to answer by yourself. My dream for the future is to be a stuffed animal. The family consists of a French mother, a Japanese father, and a Gothic-loving older sister, who are very close to each other, but the persistent father treats them coldly. The image color is Yamabuki color. In the Hoshimori Idol Project, while struggling with unfamiliar dance, he performed well as a leader of Team Yellow "Chuuuuu ♡ Lip" and grew up greatly. He rescued Sadne while watching the situation of Sadne who was deprived of power by Evina in the second part of Part 1 Chapter 6. In the pre-general election before the game was distributed, he won the second place. In "Adga", he belongs to "Pixie".

Junior high school third grade

Birthday: October 2, Height: 154 cm, Weight: 44 kg, 3 sizes: 89/62/87, Blood type: A type, Club activities: Astronomical club. A timid and crybaby, but a girl with a gentle personality. I'm not good at talking to men other than my father because I'm reluctant to think about it as if I was nervous when I first met the main character. I am making a wish to find a shooting star in order to correct such a personality. He is enthusiastic about the astronomical department, and even observes astronomical objects in the school building the night after school. The hairstyle is dark brown medium hair with a braided cutie. The reason for becoming Hoshimori was "because I was asked to be", but it was not revealed who asked me. It is thought that this may be the case because "I can hear the voice of the stars". No one believed it, but I'm glad that the hero believed it obediently. His parents' house is a shrine, and he has a father of a priesthood, and Shinbi himself serves God as a shrine maiden. It was pointed out by the girl who came to buy Hamaya because her chest was big as if she was regarded as a rival for proportions. It is called in hiragana, probably because it is treated as "Kokomi" by Urara. The image color for the Hoshimori Idol Project is cyan blue. In "Adga", he belongs to "Pixie".

Birthday: February 3, Height: 150 cm, Weight: 38 kg, 3 sizes: 82/54/80, Blood type: B type, Club activities: Swimming club. A bright, energetic and coquettish girl who wants to be an idol. She sees Shinbi as a rival and is jealous of her big breasts, but she is basically on good terms. There is something similar to lotus flower, but from the remarks that mislead adult men and their appearance, the backs are rather small devils. The desire to become a top idol is genuine, and he is devoted to writing, composing, and making efforts as well as daily research. When the dream comes true, it seems that the setting is "I was living a quiet and modest student days". There is also a self-made idol photo book. Like lotus flower, he is good at searching for rumors and secrets of people. The push is strong, and he is taking a positive approach to the main character, such as saying, "When I become an idol, I will tell you that I have a special preference as a teacher". The hairstyle is a twin tail with long red hair that hangs on the back tied with a white ribbon. He is a big fan of the idol group "Colo Girls", but his father, who is not familiar with idols, has not gained much understanding. There is a sister complex of "Urara / Life" who calls Urara an "angel". He seems to be smart, but when it comes to the back, he can't see the surroundings and he sends long emails every day. The first person is "Urara" and sometimes ends with "Yon". Also, all Hoshimori are called by Ada name. The image color for the Hoshimori Idol Project is rose pink. In the "Adoga", "Pixie leader of (Pixie)".

Teachers

 
 (anime)

Teachers

Songs

Theme song

Believe
Aya Suzaki

Idol song

1st Anniversary Single "STAR☆T" / 2016.4.27

Our start line!
Chuuuuu♡Lip

Believe In Stars
Sirius

Traitority of Heart
Tiara

"Deep-Connect" / 2016.11.23

Deep-Connect
f*f

Decision
f*f

Desire Link
f*f

"Idol Girl After School" Character Vocal Series

Release 01 / 2016.8.24

Pop☆Girls!
Princess

Unlock
ROGUE

Release 02 / 2016.12.21

You are my ... ♡
Pixie

Glowing×Heart
/ MUTE

Released 03 / 2017.2.22

Natsuune -Fushigi Nairo-
Clover

Cat-Cat Romance
f*f

Special content

Web radio
Distributed on official website every Tuesday from June 30, 2015 – December 8, 2015

Web manga
Distributed on official website.

Web 4-koma
Distributed from the official website June 9, 2015.

LINE stickers
Distributed on LINE to celebrate 3 million download from November 1, 2016.

Anime television series
An anime television series aired from July 2 to September 17, 2017. It is directed by Noriaki Akitaya at studio Silver Link, with scripts written by Yōsuke Kuroda and character design by Shūhei Yamamoto and Hideki Furukawa.

Music
Opening Theme
Hoshi no Kizuna by Shinjugamine Girls' Academy Hoshimori Class (Aya Suzaki, Ayane Sakura, Sora Amamiya, Nao Tōyama, Sumire Uesaka, Saori Hayami, Kaede Hondo, Shino Shimoji, Yumi Uchiyama, Yoshino Nanjō, Mutsumi Tamura)
Ending Theme
Melody Ring by f*f (Kaede Hondo & Shino Shimoji)

Notes

References

External links
  
 

2017 anime television series debuts
Magical girl anime and manga
Sentai Filmworks
Silver Link
Television shows written by Yōsuke Kuroda